Jhuo Li-shan (born 20 October 1996) is a Taiwanese footballer who plays as a midfielder for Taiwan Mulan Football League club Hualien FC and the Chinese Taipei women's national team.

International career
Jhuo Li-shan represented Chinese Taipei at two AFC U-19 Women's Championship editions (2013 and 2015). She capped at senior level during two EAFF E-1 Football Championship editions (2017 and 2019), the 2018 AFC Women's Asian Cup qualification, the 2018 Asian Games and the 2020 AFC Women's Olympic Qualifying Tournament.

References

1996 births
Living people
Women's association football midfielders
Taiwanese women's footballers
Chinese Taipei women's international footballers
Asian Games competitors for Chinese Taipei
Footballers at the 2018 Asian Games